High Hill is a city in Montgomery County, Missouri, United States. The population was 186 at the 2020 census.

History
A post office called High Hill has been in operation since 1837. The community was so named on account of its lofty elevation.

Farmers Mercantile Co. Building and High Hill School are listed on the National Register of Historic Places.

Geography
High Hill is adjacent to Interstate 70. The city is accessible from the expressway via Highway F.

Demographics

2010 census
As of the census of 2010, there were 195 people, 85 households, and 51 families living in the city. The racial makeup of the city was 95.9% White, 1.0% Native American, 2.1% Asian, 0.5% from other races, and 0.5% from two or more races. Hispanic or Latino of any race were 1.0% of the population.

There were 85 households, of which 28.2% had children under the age of 18 living with them, 48.2% were married couples living together, 8.2% had a female householder with no husband present, 3.5% had a male householder with no wife present, and 40.0% were non-families. 36.5% of all households were made up of individuals, and 18.8% had someone living alone who was 65 years of age or older. The average household size was 2.29 and the average family size was 2.98.

The median age in the city was 43.9 years. 20.5% of residents were under the age of 18; 5.2% were between the ages of 18 and 24; 25.1% were from 25 to 44; 27.7% were from 45 to 64; and 21.5% were 65 years of age or older. The gender makeup of the city was 51.3% male and 48.7% female.

2000 census
As of the census of 2000, there were 231 people, 102 households, and 62 families living in the city. The population density was 502.2 people per square mile (193.9/km2). There were 120 housing units at an average density of 260.9 per square mile (100.7/km2). The racial makeup of the city was 96.10% White, 0.43% Native American, 1.30% Asian, and 2.16% from two or more races.

There were 102 households, out of which 27.5% had children under the age of 18 living with them, 49.0% were married couples living together, 6.9% had a female householder with no husband present, and 39.2% were non-families. 35.3% of all households were made up of individuals, and 21.6% had someone living alone who was 65 years of age or older. The average household size was 2.26 and the average family size was 2.98.

In the city, the population was spread out, with 22.9% under the age of 18, 10.4% from 18 to 24, 18.2% from 25 to 44, 29.9% from 45 to 64, and 18.6% who were 65 years of age or older. The median age was 44 years. For every 100 females, there were 97.4 males. For every 100 females age 18 and over, there were 95.6 males.

The median income for a household in the city was $31,429, and the median income for a family was $36,250. Males had a median income of $32,500 versus $17,188 for females. The per capita income for the city was $18,155. About 4.7% of families and 10.7% of the population were below the poverty line, including 2.6% of those under the age of eighteen and 22.2% of those sixty-five or over.

References

Cities in Montgomery County, Missouri
Cities in Missouri